Kim Marius Nielsen (born 16 January 1986) is a Danish former cyclist.

Major results
2007
 Tour of South China Sea
1st Stages 3, 4 & 5
2008
 1st Stage 3 Istrian Spring Trophy
 1st Stage 5 Tour de Berlin

References

External links

1986 births
Living people
Danish male cyclists